The String Quartet No. 4 in E minor, Op. 44, No. 2, was composed by Felix Mendelssohn in 1837, and revised in 1839.

This work was premièred on 29 October 1837 at Leipzig with great success, and published as a full score in 1840. The piece is part of the Op. 44 set of 3 string quartets that Mendelssohn dedicated to the Crown Prince of Sweden. While Mendelssohn's first and second quartet were written under the influence of Beethoven, Op.44 exhibits a clear sprouting of the composer's originality in style.

Movements 

Like all of Mendelssohn's string quartets, this work has four movements:

 Allegro assai appassionato
 Scherzo: Allegro di molto
 Andante
 Presto agitato

A typical performance just under 30 minutes.

References

External links 

Performance by the Belcea Quartet from the Isabella Stewart Gardner Museum in MP3 format

String quartets by Felix Mendelssohn
1837 compositions
Compositions in E minor